This is a list of Star Wars comic books, set in the fictional Star Wars universe. Lucasfilm's now-corporate sibling Marvel Comics, which published Star Wars comic books from 1977 to 1986, again began publishing Star Wars titles in 2015. Dark Horse Comics owned the license to publish Star Wars comics from Lucasfilm exclusively from 1991 to 2014. Almost all comics published prior to 2015 have been rebranded as non-canon with the designation Legends.

BBY stands for years before the Battle of Yavin, which occurred during the original Star Wars film. ABY stands for years after the Battle of Yavin.

Film and television adaptations

All pre-2014 film and television adaptations are in the Legends continuity, even though they adapt Canon films.

Film adaptations
 Star Wars (Marvel Comics)
1–6: Star Wars by Roy Thomas
 Star Wars
 Six Against the Galaxy
 Death Star
 In Battle with Darth Vader
 Lo, the Moons of Yavin
 Is This the Final Chapter?
39–44: The Empire Strikes Back by Archie Goodwin
Beginning
 Battleground: Hoth
 Imperial Pursuit
 To Be a Jedi
 Betrayal at Bespin
 Duel a Dark Lord
 Return of the Jedi by Archie Goodwin
 Dark Horse Comics
 Star Wars: A New Hope — The Special Edition by Bruce Jones
 Episode I: The Phantom Menace by Henry Gilroy
 Episode II: Attack of the Clones by Henry Gilroy
 Episode III: Revenge of the Sith by Miles Lane

These film and television adaptations are canon, except for the parts where they divert from the films.

Television adaptations

Canon original stories

Comics

Anthology series

Star Wars Adventures
Star Wars Adventures is an anthology series published by IDW Publishing, which debuted in September 2017.

 Volume 1: Heroes of the Galaxy (October 2017)
 Issue #0 (July 2017)
Star Wars Adventures Ashcan, by Landry Q. Walker
Available exclusively at the 2017 San Diego Comic-Con
 Issue #1 (September 2017)
"Better the Devil You Know, Part I", by Cavan Scott
"Tales from Wild Space: Stop, Thief!", by Cavan Scott
 Issue #2 (September 2017)
"Better the Devil You Know, Part II", by Cavan Scott
"Tales from Wild Space: The Flat Mountain of Yavin", by Elsa Charretier & Pierrick Colinet
 Volume 2: Unexpected Detour (February 2018)
 Issue #3 (October 2017)
"Pest Control", by Landry Q. Walker
"Tales from Wild Space: Adventures in Wookiee-Sitting", by Alan Tudyk & Shannon Denton
 Issue #4 (November 2017)
"The Trouble at Tibrin, Part I", by Landry Q. Walker
"Tales from Wild Space: Mattis Makes a Stand", by Ben Acker & Ben Blacker
 Issue #5 (December 2017)
"The Trouble at Tibrin, Part II", by Landry Q. Walker
"Tales from Wild Space: The Best Pet", by Delilah S. Dawson
 Volume 3: Endangered (June 2018)
 Issue #6 (January 2018)
"Rose Knows", by Delilah S. Dawson 
"Tales from Wild Space: Podracer's Rescue", by Shaun Manning
 Issue #7 (February 2018)
"Endangered, Part 1", by Sholly Fisch
"Tales from Wild Space: Look Before You Leap", by Paul Crilley
 Issue #8 (March 2018)
"Endangered, Part 2", by Sholly Fisch
"Tales from Wild Space: Gonk", by Otis Frampton
 Volume 4: Smuggler's Blues (October 2018)
 Star Wars Adventures Free Comic Book Day 2018 (May 2018)
"Hunter vs Hunted", by Cavan Scott
 Issue #10 (May 2018)
"Powered Down, Part 1", by Cavan Scott
"Tales from Wild Space: Family Affair, Part 1", by Elsa Charretier & Pierrick Colinet
 Issue #11 (June 2018)
"Powered Down, Part 2", by Cavan Scott
"Tales from Wild Space: Family Affair, Part 2", by Elsa Charretier & Pierrick Colinet
 Volume 5: Mechanical Mayhem (March 2019)
 Issue #9 (April 2018)
"Trouble Again", by John Barber
"Tales from Wild Space: IG-88 vs. The Gatto Gang", by Nick Brokenshire
 Issue #12 (July 2018)
"Intermission, Part I", by Elsa Charretier & Pierrick Colinet
"Tales from Wild Space: A Small Push", by Scott Peterson
 Issue #13 (August 2018)
"Intermission, Part II", by Elsa Charretier & Pierrick Colinet
 Volume 6: Flight of the Falcon (July 2019)
 Issue #14 (September 2018)
 Issue #15 (October 2018)
 Issue #16 (December 2018)
 Issue #17 (January 2019)
 Issue #18 (February 2019)
 Star Wars Adventures: Flight of the Falcon one-shot (May 2019)
 Volume 7: Pomp and Circumstance (November 2019)
 Star Wars Adventures Annual 2018, by John Jackson Miller (April 2018)
"Mind Your Manners", by John Jackson Miller
"The Lost Eggs of Livorno", by Cavan Scott
 Volume 8: Defend the Republic! (February 2020)
 Issue #19 (March 2019)
 Issue #20 (April 2019)
 Volume 9: Fight the Empire! (June 2020)
 Issue #21 (May 2019)
 Issue #22 (June 2019)
 Issue #23 (July 2019)
 Volume 10: Driving Force (September 2020)
 Issue #24 (August 2019)
 Issue #25 (September 2019)
 Issue #26 (September 2019)
 Volume 11: Rise of the Wookiees (January 2021)
 Issue #27 (October 2019)
 Issue #28 (November 2019)
 Issue #29 (December 2019)
 Issue #30 (January 2020)
 Issue #31 (March 2020)
 Issue #32 (July 2020)
 One-shots
 Star Wars Adventures Free Comic Book Day 2018 (May 2018)
 Star Wars Adventures Free Comic Book Day 2019 (May 2019)
 Star Wars Adventures Annual 2019 (August 2018)

Star Wars Adventures: Destroyer Down
Star Wars Adventures: Destroyer Down is a trade paperback published by IDW Publishing that debuted in December 2017 as a Loot Crate exclusive. It was reprinted as a three-issue miniseries beginning in November 2018, with a reprint of the trade paperback arriving in June 2019. The comic consists of a main story titled "Destroyer Down," and a back-up story titled "The Ghost Ship." Both stories were written by Scott Beatty.

Star Wars Forces of Destiny

Star Wars Forces of Destiny is an anthology miniseries published by IDW Publishing that debuted in 2018. It ran for five issues and focuses on the female characters of the franchise. Authors include Jody Houser, Delilah S. Dawson, Elsa Charretier, Beth Revis, and Devin Grayson. All five comics were collected into a single volume in April 2018.
Leia, by Elsa Charretier & Pierrick Colinet (January 2018)
Rey, by Jody Houser (January 2018)
Adaptation of Star Wars Forces of Destiny episodes 1 and 2.
Hera, by Devin Grayson (January 2018)
Ahsoka & Padmé, by Beth Revis (January 2018)
Adaptation of Star Wars Forces of Destiny episode 6.
Rose & Paige, by Delilah S. Dawson (January 2018)

Star Wars Adventures: Tales from Vader's Castle
Star Wars: Tales from Vader's Castle is an anthology miniseries published by IDW Publishing released in October 2018. It ran for five issues and was written by Cavan Scott.

Star Wars Adventures: Return to Vader's Castle
Star Wars: Return to Vader's Castle is an anthology miniseries published by IDW Publishing released in October 2019 as a sequel to Tales from Vader's Castle. It ran for five issues and was written by Cavan Scott.

Star Wars Adventures: The Clone Wars - Battle Tales
Star Wars: The Clone Wars - Battle Tales is an anthology miniseries published by IDW Publishing released from May 2020-September 2020. It ran for five issues and was written by Michael Moreci.

Star Wars Adventures 2020
Star Wars Adventures 2020 is a sequel comic series to the 2017 Star Wars Adventures, published by IDW Publishing.

 Volume 1: The Light and the Dark
 Issue #1 (October 2020)
 Issue #2 (November 2020)
 Issue #3 (February 2021)
 Issue #4 (March 2021)
 Issue #5 (March 2021)
 Issue #6 (April 2021)
Uncollected
 Star Wars Adventures Annual 2020 (November 2020)
 Issue #7 (April 2021)
 Issue #8 (May 2021)
 Issue #9 (May 2021)

Star Wars Adventures: Shadow of Vader's Castle
Star Wars: Shadow of Vader's Castle is a one-shot comic published by IDW Publishing released in November 2020 as a sequel to Return to Vader's Castle. It was written by Cavan Scott.

Star Wars Adventures: Smuggler's Run
Star Wars Adventures: Smuggler's Run is a reprint of the German magazine comic Star Wars: Smuggler's Run, which adapts the Greg Rucka novel of the same name. It was published by IDW Publishing and released from December 2020-January 2021.

Star Wars: The High Republic Adventures
Star Wars: The High Republic Adventures is an anthology miniseries published by IDW Publishing released in February 2021 and finished in February 2022. It s written by Daniel Older.

Star Wars Adventures: Weapon of a Jedi
Star Wars Adventures: Weapon of a Jedi is a reprint of the German magazine comic Star Wars: Weapon of a Jedi, which adapts the Jason Fry novel of the same name. It will published by IDW Publishing and released in May 2021.

Star Wars Adventures: Ghosts of Vader's Castle
Star Wars: Ghosts of Vader's Castle is an upcoming one-shot comic published by IDW Publishing that will be a sequel to Shadow of Vader's Castle.

Star Wars: Age of Republic
Star Wars: Age of Republic is an anthology miniseries published by Marvel Comics that debuted in December 2018. It ran for nine issues written by Jody Houser, and served as the first part of the larger Age of maxiseries. Age of Republic was collected into two volumes, Villains and Heroes released on May 21 and 28, 2019, respectively. Villains collects Darth Maul, Jango Fett, Special, Count Dooku, and General Grievous; Heroes collects Qui-Gon Jinn, Obi-Wan Kenobi, Anakin Skywalker, and Padmé Amidala.
Qui-Gon Jinn in "Balance" (December 2018)
Darth Maul in "Ash" (December 2018)
Obi-Wan Kenobi in "Mission" (January 2019)
Jango Fett in "Training" (January 2019)
Special: Asajj Ventress in "Sisters" (January 2019)
Special: Captain Rex & Jar Jar Binks in "501. plus one" (January 2019)
Special: Mace Windu in "The Weapon" (January 2019)
Anakin Skywalker in "The Sacrifice" (February 2019)
Count Dooku in "The Cost" (February 2019)
Padmé Amidala in "Bridge" (March 2019)
General Grievous in "Burn" (March 2019)

Star Wars: Age of Rebellion
Star Wars: Age of Rebellion is an anthology miniseries published by Marvel Comics that debuted in April 2019. It ran for nine issues written by Greg Pak and drawn by Chris Sprouse, and served as the second part of the larger Age of maxiseries. Age of Rebellion was collected into two volumes, Heroes and Villains that were released on August 20 and September 3, 2019, respectively. Heroes collects Princess Leia, Han Solo, Lando Calrissian, and Luke Skywalker; Villains collects Grand Moff Tarkin, Special, Boba Fett, Jabba the Hutt, and Darth Vader.
Grand Moff Tarkin in "Tooth and Claw" (April 2019)
Princess Leia in "Princess Scoundrel" (April 2019)
Special: IG-88 in "The Long Game" (April 2019)
Special: Biggs Darklighter & Jek Porkins in "Stolen Valor" (April 2019)
Special: Yoda in "The Trials of Dagobah" (April 2019)
Han Solo in "Running from the Rebellion" (May 2019)
Boba Fett in "Hunter's Heart" (May 2019)
Lando Calrissian in "Cloud City Blues" (May 2019)
Jabba the Hutt in "Great to be Jabba" (May 2019)
Luke Skywalker in "Fight or Flight" (June 2019)
Darth Vader in "To The Letter" (June 2019)

Star Wars: Age of Resistance
Star Wars: Age of Resistance is an anthology miniseries published by Marvel Comics that debuted in July 2019. It ran for nine issues written by Tom Taylor and drawn by Leonard Kirk, and serves as the third and final part of the larger Age of maxiseries. Age of Resistance was collected into two volumes, Heroes and Villains that were released on November 26 and December 3, 2019, respectively. Heroes collects Finn, Special, Poe Dameron, Rose Tico and Rey; Villains collects Captain Phasma, General Hux, Supreme Leader Snoke, and Kylo Ren.
Finn in "Infestation" (July 2019)
Captain Phasma in "Fallen Guns" (July 2019)
Special: Maz Kanata in "Maz's Scoundrels" (July 2019)
Special: Amylin Holdo in "The Bridge" (July 2019)
Special: BB-8 in "Robot Resistance" (July 2019)
Poe Dameron in "Fight or Flight" (August 2019)
General Hux in "Marooned" (August 2019)
Rose Tico in "My Hero" (September 2019)
Supreme Leader Snoke in "Fail. Or Kill it." (September 2019)
Rey in "Alone" (September 2019)
Kylo Ren in "Out of the Shadow" (September 2019)

Comic strips

Star Wars Rebels comic strips
The Star Wars Rebels comic strips are set in-between episodes of the Disney XD television show of the same name. The first 37 strips were published in the monthly Germany, UK, and U.S.A. Star Wars Rebels Magazine issues, which debuted in January 2015. The UK and U.S.A. versions were discontinued in 2016, with the German version being discontinued in 2017. After issue, 39, the strips were published in the bimonthly German magazine Star Wars Rebels Animation-Magazine.  Trade paperback volumes have also been released in Germany and France. In 2022, Dark Horse published a trade paperback collection of all strips in English language.

Star Wars Rebels Magazine strips
All comics from this magazine were written by Martin Fisher and Jeremy Barlow.

Volume 1: Resistance (March 2016)
Ring Race (Issue #1) 
Learning Patience (Issue #2)
The fake Jedi (Issue #3)
Kallus' Hunt (Issue #4)
Return of the Slavers (Issue #5)
Eyes on the Prize (Issue #6)
Sabotaged Supplies (Issue #7, reprinted in Issue #36)
Ezra's Vision (Issue #8, reprinted in Issue #38)
Volume 2: Changes (September 2016)
Senate Perspective (Issue #9)
Becoming Hunted (Issue #10)
Assessment (Issue #11)
Ocean Rescue (Issue #12)
Secrets of Sienar (Issue #13)
No Sympathy (Issue #14)
A Day's Duty (Issue #15)
Ice Breaking (Issue #16)
Volume 3: Rebellion at the Edge of the Galaxy (July 2017)
Vulnerable Areas (Issue #17)
Academy Cadets (Issue #18)
Escaping the Scrap Pile (Issue #19)
The Gangsters of Galzez (Issue #20)
Puffer Problems (Issue #21)
The Thune Cargo (Issue #22)
Always Bet on Chop (Issue #23)
The Second Chance (Issue #24)
Uncollected
The Ballad of 264 (Issue #25)
The Line of Duty (Issue #26)
A Time to Survive (Issue #27)
Too Late to Change (Issue #28)
The Size of the Fight (Issue #29)
The Wrong Crowd (Issue #30)
Off the Rails (Issue #31)
To Thy Metal Heart be True (Issue #32)
Sons of the Sky (Issue #33)
Final Round (Issue #34)
A Youth Unpromising (Issue #35)
Fifth and Final (Issue #37)
Never Far Behind (Issue #39)

Star Wars Rebels Animation-Magazine strips
All comics from this magazine were written by Alec Worley.

Uncollected
A Trooper's Worth (Issue #1)
Divide and Conquer (Issue #2)
The Beast Within (Issue #3)
Crossing the Line (Issue #4)

Star Wars Resistance comic strips
The Star Wars Resistance comic strips are adaptations of episodes of the Disney XD television show of the same name. The  strips were published in the monthly German Star Wars Resistance Animation-Magazine issues, which debuted in May 2019, however it was discontinued after four issues. A fifth strip was included in Star Wars Fun & Action.

Star Wars Resistance Animation-Magazine strips
All comics from this magazine were written by Alec Worley.

The Recruit, Part 1 (Issue #1)
The Recruit, Part 2 (Issue #2)
The Triple Dark (Issue #3)
Fuel for the Fire (Issue #4)

Star Wars Fun & Action strips
Most comics in Star Wars Fun & Action were reprints of previous Star Wars Adventures comics

The High Tower by Alec Worley

"Red Four"
"Red Four" was a one-page comic strip released in Marvel Comics 1000.

Animated webcomics
In September 2015, multinational food and beverage company Nestlé released two animated webcomics as part of a licensed Star Wars-themed promotional campaign for The Force Awakens. Adapted from the novels The Weapon of a Jedi: A Luke Skywalker Adventure by Jason Fry and Smuggler's Run: A Han Solo & Chewbacca Adventure by Greg Rucka, the two animated comics were originally offered exclusively on the now-defunct Nestlé Comics website by typing a digital code featured on every box of Nestlé cereals.

Novel adaptations into German comics
The comics listed here are licensed by Disney, but were not released by Marvel or Disney-Lucasfilm Press. Their canonical status is disputed due to some minor changes made to the story due to cultural interpretation.

Star Wars: Weapon of a Jedi (2017)
Star Wars: Weapon of a Jedi is a four-part German comic adaptation of the Jason Fry novel of the same name by Alec Worley. The comics are available in Issues #19–22 of Star Wars Magazin, published by Panini Comics. A trade paperback volume has been released in March 2018, and eventually an English translation will released in May 2021 as Star Wars Adventures: Weapon of a Jedi. Set in the Rise of the Empire Era, between Episode IV: A New Hope and Episode V: The Empire Strikes Back.
Issue #19, Comic #1 (March 2017)
Issue #20, Comic #2 (May 2017)
Issue #21, Comic #3 (July 2017)
Issue #22, Comic #4 (September 2017)

Star Wars: Smuggler's Run (2018)
Star Wars: Smuggler's Run is a four-part German comic adaptation of the Greg Rucka novel of the same name by Alec Worley. The comics are available in Issues #1–4 of Das Star Wars Universum, published by Panini Comics, and eventually, an English translation was released in 2020-2021 as Star Wars Adventures: Smuggler's Run. Set in the Rise of the Empire Era, between Episode IV: A New Hope and Episode V: The Empire Strikes Back.
Issue #1, Comic #1 (January 2018)
Issue #2, Comic #2 (February 2018)
Issue #3, Comic #3 (March 2018)
Issue #4, Comic #4 (April 2018)

Cancelled canon comics
The following comics have been officially announced, but have not been released or officially cancelled.

Star Wars Legends comics original stories

Before the Republic Era  (37,000–25,000 BBY)

Dawn of the Jedi
36,453 BBY
 Force Storm by John Ostrander (Dawn of the Jedi #1–5)
 The Prisoner of Bogan by John Ostrander (Dawn of the Jedi #6–10)
 The Force War by John Ostrander (Dawn of the Jedi #11–15)

Old Galactic Republic Era a.k.a. The Sith Era (5,000–1,000 BBY)

Tales of the Jedi
5,000 BBY
 Tales of the Jedi: Golden Age of the Sith by Kevin J. Anderson

4,990 BBY
 Tales of the Jedi: The Fall of the Sith Empire by Kevin J. Anderson

4,000 BBY - 3,999 BBY
 Tales of the Jedi: Knights of the Old Republic by Tom Veitch

3,998 BBY
 Tales of the Jedi: The Freedon Nadd Uprising by Tom Veitch

3,996 BBY
 Tales of the Jedi: Dark Lords of the Sith by Tom Veitch and Kevin J. Anderson
 Tales of the Jedi: The Sith War by Kevin J. Anderson

3,993 BBY
 Shadows and Light by Joshua Ortega (published in Tales #23)

3,986 BBY
 Tales of the Jedi: Redemption by Kevin J. Anderson

Knights of the Old Republic
3,964 BBY
 Crossroads by John Jackson Miller (Knights of the Old Republic #0, published in the Knights of the Old Republic / Rebellion Flip Book)
 Commencement by John Jackson Miller (Knights of the Old Republic #1–6)
 Flashpoint by John Jackson Miller (Knights of the Old Republic #7–8, #10)

3,963 BBY
 Flashpoint Interlude: Homecoming by John Jackson Miller (Knights of the Old Republic #9)
 Reunion by John Jackson Miller (Knights of the Old Republic #11–12)
 Days of Fear by John Jackson Miller (Knights of the Old Republic #13–15)
 Nights of Anger by John Jackson Miller (Knights of the Old Republic #16–18)
 Daze of Hate by John Jackson Miller (Knights of the Old Republic #19–21)
 Knights of Suffering by John Jackson Miller (Knights of the Old Republic #22–24)
 Vector by John Jackson Miller (Knights of the Old Republic #25–28)
 Exalted by John Jackson Miller (Knights of the Old Republic #29–30)
 Turnabout by John Jackson Miller (Knights of the Old Republic #31)
 Vindication by John Jackson Miller (Knights of the Old Republic #32–35)
 Prophet Motive by John Jackson Miller (Knights of the Old Republic #36–37)
 Faithful Execution by John Jackson Miller (Knights of the Old Republic #38)
 Dueling Ambitions by John Jackson Miller (Knights of the Old Republic #39–41)
 Masks by John Jackson Miller (Knights of the Old Republic #42)
 The Reaping by John Jackson Miller (Knights of the Old Republic #43–44)
 Destroyer by John Jackson Miller (Knights of the Old Republic #45–46)
 Demon by John Jackson Miller (Knights of the Old Republic #47–50)

3,962 BBY
 Knights of the Old Republic: War by John Jackson Miller

3,952 BBY
 Unseen, Unheard by Chris Avellone (published in Tales #24)

Cold War
3,678 BBY
 The Old Republic: Blood of the Empire by Alexander Freed

3,653 BBY
 The Old Republic: Threat of Peace by Rob Chestney

3,643 BBY
 The Old Republic: The Lost Suns by Alexander Freed

2,975 BBY
 Lost Tribe of the Sith: Spiral by John Jackson Miller

Knight Errant
1,032 BBY
 Aflame by John Jackson Miller (Knight Errant #1–5)
 Deluge by John Jackson Miller (Knight Errant #6–10)
 Escape by John Jackson Miller (Knight Errant #11–15)

The Battle of Ruusan
1,000 BBY
 Jedi vs. Sith by Darko Macan

Rise of the Empire Era (1,000–0 BBY)

Prelude to War
1000 BBY
 The Apprentice by Mike Denning (published in Tales #17)

996 BBY
 All For You by Adam Gallardo (published in Tales #17)

700 BBY
 Heart of Darkness by Paul Lee (published in Tales #16)

245 BBY
 Yaddle's Tale: The One Below by Dean Motter (published in Tales #5)

67 BBY
 Vow of Justice by Jan Strnad (published in Star Wars: Republic #4–6)

58 BBY
 Stones by Haden Blackman (published in  Tales #13)

53 BBY
 Jedi – The Dark Side by Scott Allie

45 BBY
 Survivors by Jim Krueger (published in  Tales #13)
 George R. Binks by Dave McCaig (published in  Tales #20)

44 BBY
 Mythology by Chris Eliopoulos (published in  Tales #14)

43 BBY
 The Secret of Tet Ami by Fabian Nicieza (published in  Tales #13)

38 BBY
 Qui-Gon and Obi-Wan: The Aurorient Express by Mike Kennedy

37 BBY
 Once Bitten by C. B. Cebulski (published in  Tales #12)

36 BBY
 Children of the Force by Jason Hall (published in  Tales #13)
 Qui-Gon and Obi-Wan: Last Stand on Ord Mantell by Ryder Windham
 Aurra's Song by Dean Motter (published in Dark Horse Presents Annual 2000)

34 BBY
 Nameless by Christian Read (published in Tales #10)

33 BBY
 Marked by Rob Williams (published in Tales #24)
 Urchins by Stan Sakai (published in Tales#14)
 Jedi Council: Acts of War by Randy Stradley
 A Summer's Dream by Terry Moore (published in Tales #5)
 Life, Death, and the Living Force by Jim Woodring (published in Tales #1)
 Incident at Horn Station by Dan Jolley (published in Tales #2)

32.5 BBY
 Prelude to Rebellion by Jan Strnad (Star Wars: Republic #1–6)
 Single Cell by Haden Blackman (published in Tales #7)
 Darth Maul by Ron Marz
 The Death of Captain Tarpals by Ryder Windham (published in Tales #3)

The Phantom Menace
32 BBY

 Star Wars Episode I: Anakin Skywalker by Timothy Truman (first published in Star Wars Episode I 1999)
 Star Wars Episode I: Queen Amidala by Mark Schultz (first published in Star Wars Episode I
 Star Wars Episode I: Qui-Gon Jinn by Ryder Windham (first published in Star Wars Episode I 1999)
 Star Wars Episode I: Obi-Wan Kenobi by Henry Gilroy (first published in Star Wars Episode I 1999)
 Podracing Tales by Ryder Windham (online comic)
 Outlander by Tim Truman (Star Wars: Republic #7–12)
 Deal with a Demon by John Ostrander (published in Tales #3)
 Nomad by Rob Williams (published in Tales #21–24)
 Emissaries to Malastare by Tim Truman (Star Wars: Republic #13–18)
 Jango Fett: Open Seasons by Haden Blackman

The Calm Before the Storm
31 BBY
 Twilight by John Ostrander (Star Wars: Republic #19–22)
 Infinity's End by Pat Mills (Star Wars: Republic #23–26)
 Starcrash by Doug Petrie (Star Wars: Republic #27)

30 BBY
 The Stark Hyperspace War by John Ostrander (Star Wars: Republic #36–39)
 Bad Business by John Ostrander (published in Tales#8)
 The Hunt for Aurra Sing by Tim Truman (Star Wars: Republic #28–31)
 Heart of Fire by John Ostrander (published in Dark Horse Extra #35–37)
 Darkness by John Ostrander (Star Wars: Republic #32–35)
 The Devaronian Version by John Ostrander (Star Wars: Republic #40–41)

28 BBY
 Rite of Passage by John Ostrander (Star Wars: Republic #42–45)
 Jedi Quest by Ryder Windham

27 BBY
 Jango Fett by Ron Marz
 Zam Wesell by Ron Marz
 Aurra Sing by Timothy Truman (published in The Bounty Hunters)
 The Sith in Shadow by Bob Harris (published in Tales#13)

25 BBY
 Poison Moon by Michael Carriglitto (published in Dark Horse Extra #44–47)

24 BBY
 A Jedi's Weapon by Henry Gilroy (published in Tales#12)
 Starfighter: Crossbones by Haden Blackman
 Puzzle Peace by Scott Beatty (published in Tales#13)
 Honor and Duty by John Ostrander (Star Wars: Republic #46–48)

23 BBY
 Way of the Warrior by Peter Alilunas (published in Tales#18)
 Full of Surprises by Jason Hall (published in Hasbro/Toys"R"Us Exclusive)
 Most Precious Weapon by Jason Hall (published in Hasbro/Toys"R"Us Exclusive)
 Practice Makes Perfect by Jason Hall (published in Hasbro/Toys"R"Us Exclusive)
 Machines of War by Jason Hall (published in Hasbro/Toys"R"Us Exclusive)

Attack of the Clones/The Clone Wars
22 BBY

 Clone Wars Volume 1: The Defense of Kamino by John Ostrander, Jan Duursema, Haden Blackman and Scott Allie (Published by Titan Books Ltd.)
 Sacrifice by John Ostrander (Republic #49)
 The Battle of Kamino by John Ostrander, Haden Blackman and Scott Allie (Republic #50)
 Jedi: Mace Windu by John Ostrander
 Clone Wars Volume 2: Victories and Sacrifices by Haden Blackman, John Ostrander, Tomas Giorello and Jan Duursema (Published by Titan Books Ltd.)
 The New Face of War by Haden Blackman (Republic #51–52)
 Blast Radius by Haden Blackman (Republic #53)
 Jedi: Shaak Ti by John Ostrander
 Nobody's Perfect by Peter Bagge (published in Tales #20)
 The Lesson by Adam Gallardo (published in Tales #14)
 Tides of Terror by Milton Freewater Jr. (published in Tales #14)
 Clone Wars Adventures Volume 1
 Blind Force by Haden Blackman
 Heavy Metal Jedi by Haden Blackman
 Fierce Currents by Haden Blackman
 Clone Wars Adventures Volume 2
 Skywalkers by Haden Blackman
 Hide in Plain Sight by Welles Hartley
 Run Mace Run by Matthew and Shawn Fillbach
 Clone Wars Adventures Volume 3
 Rogues Gallery by Haden Blackman
 The Package by Matthew and Shawn Fillbach
 Stranger in Town by Matthew and Shawn Fillbach
 One Battle by Bytim Mucci
 Clone Wars Adventures Volume 4
 Another Fine Mess by Matthew and Shawn Fillbach
 The Brink by Justin Lambros
 Orders by Ryan Kaufman
 Descent by Haden Blackman
 Clone Wars Adventures Volume 7
 Clone Wars Adventures Volume 8
 Clone Wars Adventures Volume 9
 Appetite for Adventure by Matthew and Shawn Fillbach
 Salvaged by Matthew and Shawn Fillbach
 Life Below by Matthew and Shawn Fillbach
 No Way Out by Matthew and Shawn Fillbach
 Clone Wars Adventures Volume 10
 Graduation Day by Chris Avellone
 Thunder Road by Matthew and Shawn Fillbach
 Chain of Command by Jason Hall
 Waiting by Matthew and Shawn Fillbach
 Dark Journey by Jason Hall (published in Tales#17)

21.5 BBY
 Clone Wars Volume 4: Light and Dark by John Ostrander, Jan Duursema and Dan Parsons (published by Titan Books Ltd.)
 Double Blind by John Ostrander (Republic #54)
 Jedi: Aayla Secura by John Ostrander
 Jedi: Dooku by John Ostrander
 Striking from the Shadows by John Ostrander (Republic #63)

21 BBY
 Honor Bound by Ian Edginton  (published in Tales #22)
 Rather Darkness Visible by Jeremy Barlow (published in Tales #19)
 Clone Wars Volume 3: Last Stand on Jabiim by Haden Blackman, Brian Ching, Victor Llamas (published by Titan Books Ltd.)
 The Battle of Jabiim by Haden Blackman (Republic #55–58)
 Enemy Lines by Haden Blackman (Republic #59)
 Clone Wars Volume 5: The Best Blades by John Ostrander, Haden Blackman, Jeremy Barlow, and Tomas Giorello (published by Titan Books Ltd.)
 Hate and Fear by Haden Blackman (Republic #60)
 Dead Ends by John Ostrander (Republic #61)
 No Man's Land by John Ostrander (Republic #62)
 Bloodlines by John Ostrander (Republic #64)
 Jedi: Yoda by Jeremy Barlow
 Clone Wars Volume 6: On The Fields of Battle by John Ostrander, Jan Duursema and Dan Parsons (published by Titan Books Ltd.)
 Show of Force by John Ostrander (Republic #65–66)
 Forever Young by John Ostrander (Republic #67)
 Armor by John Ostrander (Republic #68)
 The Dreadnaughts of Rendili by John Ostrander (Republic #69–71)
 Slaves of the Republic by Henry Gilroy (The Clone Wars #1–6)
 In the Service of the Republic by Henry Gilroy & Steven Melching (The Clone Wars #7–9)
 Hero of the Confederacy by Henry Gilroy & Steven Melching (The Clone Wars #10–12)
 The Clone Wars – Online-Comic #1–22
 The Clone Wars: Gauntlet of Death by Henry Gilroy (2009 Free Comic Book Day)
 The Clone Wars (TV show tie-in novellas) #1–10
 Star Wars – Blood Ties : A Tale of Jango & Boba Fett by Tom Taylor & Chris Scalf

20 BBY
 General Grievous by Chuck Dixon
 Routine Valor by Randy Stradley (2006 Free Comic Book Day)
 Star Wars: Darth Maul—Death Sentence by Tom Taylor

19.5 BBY
 Clone Wars Volume 7: When They Were Brothers by Haden Blackman and Brian Ching (published by Titan Books Ltd.)
 Obsession by Haden Blackman
 Unnamed (2005 Free Comic Book Day)
 Clone Wars Volume 8: Last Siege, The Final Truth by John Ostrander, Jan Duursema and Dan Parsons (published by Titan Books Ltd.)
 Trackdown by John Ostrander (Republic #72–73)
 Siege of Saleucami by John Ostrander (Republic #74–77)
 Brothers in Arms by Miles Lane (2005 Free Comic Book Day comic)
 Clone Wars Adventures Volume 5
 What Goes Up... by Matthew and Shawn Fillbach
 Bailed Out by Justin Lambros
 Heroes on Both Side by Chris Avellone
 Order of Outcasts by Matt Jacobs (published in Clone Wars Adventures Volume 5)
 Clone Wars Adventures Volume 6
 Means and Ends by Haden Blackman
 The Drop by Mike Kennedy
 To The Vanishing Point by Matthew and Shawn Fillbach
 It Takes a Thief by Matthew and Shawn Fillbach
 Evasive Action: Reversal of Fortune by Paul Ens

Revenge of the Sith
19 BBY

 Loyalties by John Ostrander (Star Wars: Republic #78)
 Clone Wars Volume 9: Endgame by John Ostrander, Jan Duursema and Brad Anderson (Published by Titan Books Ltd.)
 Into the Unknown (Star Wars: Republic #79–80)
 The Hidden Enemy by John Ostrander (Republic #81–83)
 Purge by John Ostrander
 Purge – Seconds to Die by John Ostrander
 Purge – The Hidden Blade by W. Haden Blackman
 Purge – The Tyrant's Fist by Alexander Freed
 Evasive Action: Recruitment by Paul Ens
 Evasive Action: Prey by Paul Ens
 The Path to Nowhere by Mick Harrison (Dark Times #1–5)
 Parallels by Mick Harrison (Dark Times #6–10)
 Vector by Mick Harrison (Dark Times #11–12)
 Blue Harvest by Mick Harrison (Dark Times #0,13–17)
 Darth Vader and the Lost Command by Hayden Blackman
 Out of the Wilderness by Mick Harrison (Dark Times #18–22)
 Darth Vader and the Ghost Prison by Hayden Blackman
 Darth Maul: Death Sentence by Tom Taylor
 Dark Times: Fire Carrier by Mick Harrison
 Dark Times: A Spark Remains by Mick Harrison

18 BBY
 The Duty by Christian Read (published in Tales#12)

18–5 BBY
 The Value of Proper Intelligence to Any Successful Military Campaign is Not to be Underestimated by Ken Lizzi (published in Tales#19)
 Darth Vader and the Ninth Assassin by Tim Siedell

16 BBY
 Old Wounds by Aaron McBride (published in Star Wars: Visionaries and in Star Wars Legends Epic Collection: The Empire Vol. 4)

17 BBY
 Darth Vader and the Cry of Shadows by Tim Siedell

15 BBY
 Star Wars: Droids #1–5 by David Manak (Marvel Comics)

12 BBY
 Ghost by Jan Duursema (published in Tales#11)
 Fortune, Fate, and the Natural History of the Sarlacc by Mark Schultz (published in Tales#6)

11 BBY
 Nerf Herder by Phil Amara (published in Tales#7)

10 BBY
 Star Wars Blood Ties: Boba Fett is Dead by Tom Taylor

8 BBY
 Luke Skywalker: Detective by Rick Geary (published in Tales#20)
 Sandstorm by Jason Hall (published in Tales#15)

7 BBY
 Number Two in the Galaxy by Henry Gilroy (published in Tales#18)
 Payback by Andy Diggle (published in Tales#18)
 Being Boba Fett by Jason Hall (published in Tales#18)

6 BBY
 The Princess Leia Diaries (pages 1–7) by Jason Hall (published in Tales#11)
 Outbid but Never Outgunned by Beau Smith (published in Tales#7)

The Dark Times
5 BBY
 Luke Skywalker: Walkabout by Phill Norwood (published in Dark Horse Presents Annual 1999)
 Routine by Tony Isabella (published in Tales#2)
 Young Lando Calrissian by Gilbert Hernandez (published in Tales#20)
 Jabba the Hutt: The Art of the Deal by Jim Woodring
 The Princess Leia Diaries (pages 8–9) by Jason Hall (published in Tales#11)

4 BBY
 Falling Star by Jim Beard (published in Tales#15)
 Star Wars: Ewoks #1–9 by David Manak

3 BBY
 The Flight of the Falcon by Steve Parkhouse (published The Empire Strikes Back Monthly #157, 1982; reprinted in Devilworlds #2, 1996)
 In the Beginning by Garth Ennis (published in Tales#11)
 Star Wars: Droids: The Kalarba Adventures by Dan Thorsland (Dark Horse series V1 #1–6)
 Star Wars: Droids Special#1 by Dan Thorsland
 Star Wars: Droids: Rebellion by Ryder Windham (Dark Horse series V2 #1–4)
 Star Wars: Droids: The Season of Revolt by Jan Strnad (Dark Horse series V2 #5–8)
 Star Wars: Droids: The Protocol Offensive by Ryder Windham
 Star Wars: Ewoks #10–14 by David Manak
 Iron Eclipse by John Ostrander (Agent of the Empire #1–5)
 Hard Targets by John Ostrander (Agent of the Empire #6–10)
 Boba Fett: Enemy of the Empire by John Wagner (published also in Star Wars Omnibus Boba Fett)

2 BBY
 Han Solo at Stars' End by Archie Goodwin (reprints strips by Alfredo Alcala)
 Star Wars Adventures: Han Solo and the Hollow Moon of Khorya by Jeremy Barlow (2 years before Star Wars: A New Hope)
 Crumb for Hire by Ryder Windham (published in A Decade of Dark Horse #2)
 First Impressions by Nathan Walker (published in Tales#15)
 The Force Unleashed by Haden Blackman

1 BBY
 The Princess Leia Diaries (pages 10–12) by Jason Hall (published in Tales#11)
 The Weapons Master by Archie Goodwin (published in Star Wars Weekly #104-106; 1980)
 The Force Unleashed II by Haden Blackman
 Darth Vader: Extinction by Ron Marz (published in Tales#1-2)
 Dark Forces: Soldier for the Empire by William C. Dietz (illustrated book)
 Blood Ties: Boba Fett is Dead by Tom Taylor

 Betrayal by Scott Allie (Empire #1–4) (some weeks prior to the battle of Yavin)
 Star Wars Underworld – The Yavin Vassilika by Mike Kennedy ("shortly before the battle of Yavin")
 Princess... Warrior by Randy Stradley (Empire #5–6) (3 weeks prior to the battle of Yavin)
 Darklighter by Paul Chadwick (Empire #8–9, 12, 15) (just prior to the events in Star Wars: A New Hope; #15 at the same time)
 The Short, Happy Life of Roons Sewell by Paul Chadwick (Empire #10–11)
 The Hovel on Terk Street by Tom Fassbender and Jom Pascoe (published in Tales#6)
 Way of the Wookiee by Archie Goodwin (published in Star Wars Weekly #94-96) ("days before" the events in Star Wars: A New Hope)
 Skippy the Jedi Droid by Peter David (published in Tales#1)

The Rebellion Era (0–5 ABY)

A New Hope
0 ABY
 The Day After the Death Star by Archie Goodwin (1980)
 The Keeper's World by Roy Thomas and Archie Goodwin (Pizzazz #1-9; 1977-1978)
 The Kingdom of Ice by Archie Goodwin (Pizzazz #10-16; 1978-1979 and the last part in Star Wars Weekly #60, 1979)
 World of Fire by Chris Claremont (World of Fire #1–3; 1980)
 Star Wars: Droids #6–8 by David Manak (Marvel Comics, 1987)
 Marvel's Star Wars (1977) by Archie Goodwin
 #1–6 adapt the film Star Wars: A New Hope
 #7 New Planets, New Perils
 #8 Eight for Aduba-3
 #9 Showdown on a Wasteland World
 #10 Behemoth from the World Below
 #11 Star Search
 #12 Doomworld
 #13 Day of the Dragon Lords
 #14 The Sound of Armageddon
 #15 Star Duel
 #16 The Hunter
 #17 Crucible
 #18 The Empire Strikes
 #19 The Ultimate Gamble
 #20 Deathgame
 #21 Shadow of a Dark Lord
 #22 To the Last Gladiator
 #23 Flight Into Fury
 #24 Silent Drifting
 #25 Siege at Yavin
 #26 Doom Mission
 #27 Return of the Hunter
 #28 What Ever Happened to Jabba the Hut?
 #29 Dark Encounter
 #30 A Princess Alone
 #31 Return to Tatooine
 #32 The Jawa Express
 #33 Saber Clash
 #34 Thunder in the Stars
 #35 Dark Lord's Gambit
 #36 Red Queen Rising
 #37 In Mortal Combat
 #38 Riders in the Void
 Annual #1 The Long Hunt
 Star Wars (Newspaper Comic Strips, 1979-1984)
 Gambler's World, by Russ Manning (Reprinted in Classic Star Wars: The Early Adventures 1, 2 and 3)
 The Constancia Affair, by Russ Manning (Reprinted as Star Wars Special: The Constancia Affair)
 The Kashyyyk Depths, by Russ Manning (Reprinted in Star Wars Legends Epic Collection: The Newspaper Strips Volume 1)
 Tatooine Sojourn, by Russ Manning and Steve Gerber (Reprinted in Classic Star Wars: The Early Adventures 4)
 Princess Leia, Imperial Servant, by Archie Goodwin as Russ Helm and Russ Manning (Reprinted in Classic Star Wars: The Early Adventures 5)
 The Second Kessel Run, by Archie Goodwin as Russ Helm and Russ Manning (Reprinted in Classic Star Wars: The Early Adventures 6)
 Bring Me the Children, by Russ Manning (Reprinted in Classic Star Wars: The Early Adventures 7)
 As Long As We Live, by Russ Manning (Reprinted in Classic Star Wars: The Early Adventures 8)
 The Frozen World of Ota, by Russ Manning (Reprinted in Classic Star Wars: The Early Adventures 9)
 Planet of Kadril, by Archie Goodwin as Russ Helm (Reprinted as a webstrip on StarWars.com)
 Han Solo at Stars' End, by Brian Daley, adapted by Archie Goodwin (Reprinted as Classic Star Wars: Han Solo at Stars' End)
 The Bounty Hunter of Ord Mantell, by Archie Goodwin (Reprinted as Classic Star Wars 1 and 2)
 Darth Vader Strikes, by Archie Goodwin (Reprinted in Classic Star Wars 2, 3 and 4)
 The Serpent Masters, by Archie Goodwin (Reprinted in Classic Star Wars 4, 5 and 6)
 Deadly Reunion, by Archie Goodwin (Reprinted in Classic Star Wars 6 and 7)
 Traitor's Gambit, by Archie Goodwin (Reprinted in Classic Star Wars 7 and 8)
 The Night Beast, by Archie Goodwin (Reprinted in Classic Star Wars 8, 9 and 10)
 The Return of Ben Kenobi, by Archie Goodwin (Reprinted in Classic Star Wars 10 and 11)
 The Power Gem, by Archie Goodwin (Reprinted in Classic Star Wars 11 and 12)
 Iceworld, by Archie Goodwin (Reprinted in Classic Star Wars 12 and 13)
 Revenge of the Jedi, by Archie Goodwin (Reprinted in Classic Star Wars 13 and 14)
 Doom Mission, by Archie Goodwin (Reprinted in Classic Star Wars 14 and 15)
 Race for Survival, by Archie Goodwin (Reprinted in Classic Star Wars 16 and 17)
 The Paradise Detour, by Archie Goodwin (Reprinted in Classic Star Wars 17 and 18)
 A New Beginning, by Archie Goodwin (Reprinted in Classic Star Wars 18, 19 and 20)
 Showdown, by Archie Goodwin (Reprinted in Classic Star Wars 20)
 The Final Trap, by Archie Goodwin (Reprinted in Classic Star Wars 20)
 Star Wars Tales (1999-2005) and similar
 Trooper by Garth Ennis (published in Tales#10)
 Walking The Path That's Given by Shane McCarthy (published in Tales#21)
 Vader's Quest by Darko Macan
 Lucky Stars by Brian Augustyn (published in Tales#15)
 River of Chaos by Louise Simenson 
 Death Star Pirates by Henry Gilroy (published in Tales#8)
 Boba Fett: Overkill by Thomas Andrews
 Star Wars Adventures: Chewbacca and The Slavers of the Shadowlands by Chris Cerasi
 Rookies: Rendezvous by Pablo Hidalgo (webstrip, published online; 2006)
 Rookies: No Turning Back by Pablo Hidalgo (webstrip, published online; 2006)
 Star Wars: Empire (2002-2006)
 What Sin Loyalty? by Jeremy Barlow (Empire #13)
 Sacrifice by John Wagner (Empire #7)
 The Savage Heart by Paul Alden (Empire #14)
 To the Last Man by Welles Hartley (Empire #16–18)
 Target: Vader by Ron Marz (Empire #19) (5 months ABY)
 A Little Piece of Home by Ron Marz (Empire #20–21)
 Alone Together by Welles Hartley (Empire #22)
 The Bravery of Being Out of Range by Jeremy Barlow (Empire #23)
 Idiot's Array by Ron Marz (Empire #24–25)
 "General" Skywalker by Ron Marz (Empire #26–27)
 Wreckage by Ron Marz (Empire #28)
 In the Shadows of Their Fathers by Thomas Andrews (Empire #29–30, 32–34)
 The Price of Power by Scott Allie (Empire #31)
 A Model Officer by John Jackson Miller (Empire #35)
 The Wrong Side of the War by Welles Hartley (Empire #36–40)
 Star Wars: Rebellion (2006-2008) (sequel to Star Wars: Empire)
 Crossroads by Thomas Andrews (Rebellion #0)
 My Brother, My Enemy by Rob Williams (Rebellion #1–5)
 The Ahakista Gambit by Brandon Badeaux and Rob Williams (Rebellion #6–10)
 Small Victories by Jeremy Barlow (Rebellion #11–14)
 Vector (Parts 7 and 8) (Rebellion #15–16)
 Star Wars (2013) by Brian Wood
 Volume 1: In The Shadow of Yavin (#1–6)
 Volume 2: From The Ruins of Alderaan (#7–12)
 Volume 3: Rebel Girl (#15–18)
 Volume 4: A Shattered Hope (#13–14, #19–20)

1 ABY
 The Pandora Effect by Alan Moore (published The Empire Strikes Back Monthly #151, 1981; reprinted in Devilworlds #2; 1996)
 Dark Knight's Devilry by Steve Moore (published The Empire Strikes Back Monthly #153, 1982; reprinted in Devilworlds #1; 1996)
 Tilotny Throws a Shape by Alan Moore (published The Empire Strikes Back Monthly #154, 1982; reprinted in Devilworlds #2; 1996)
 Dark Lord's Conscience by Alan Moore (published The Empire Strikes Back Monthly #155, 1982; reprinted in Devilworlds #1; 1996)
 Rust Never Sleeps by Alan Moore (published The Empire Strikes Back Monthly #156, 1982; reprinted in Devilworlds #2; 1996)
 Blind Fury by Alan Moore (published Star Wars Monthly #159, 1982; reprinted in Devilworlds #1; 1996)
 Boba Fett: Salvage by John Wagner (published in Boba Fett ½ and in Star Wars Omnibus Boba Fett)
 Lady Luck by Rich Handley and Darko Macan (published in Tales#3, 2000)
 Planet of the Dead by Steve Niles (published in Tales#17, 2003)

2 ABY
 Splinter of the Mind's Eye by Alan Dean Foster (1978)
 Ghosts of Hoth by Rob Williams (published in Tales#17) (2003)
 A Valentine's Story: Breaking the Ice by Judd Winick and Paul Chadwick (2003)
 The Hidden by Sean Konot and Scott Morse (published in Tales#6) (2000)
 Star Wars Adventures: Princess Leia and the Royal Ransom by Jeremy Barlow and Carlo Soriano (2009)
 Star Wars Adventures: Boba Fett and the Ship of Fear by Jeremy Barlow and Carlo Soriano (2011)

The Empire Strikes Back
3 ABY
 Classic Star Wars: A Long Time Ago... Volume 3: Resurrection of Evil (collects Marvel's Star Wars #39–53)
Star Wars expanded to other media the film Empire Strikes Back
 Death Probe by Archie Goodwin
 The Dreams of Cody Sunn-Childe by J. M. DeMatteis
 Droid World by Archie Goodwin
 The Third Law by Larry Hama
 The Last Jedi by Mike W. Barr
 The Crimson Forever by Archie Goodwin
 Resurrection of Evil by David Michelinie
 To Take The Tarkin by David Michelinie
 The Last Gift From Alderaan  by Chris Claremont
 Classic Star Wars: A Long Time Ago... Volume 4: Screams in the Void (collects Marvel's Star Wars #54–67 & Annual #2)
 Classic Star Wars: A Long Time Ago... Volume 5: Fool's Bounty (collects Marvel's Star Wars #68–81 & Annual #3)
 Moment of Doubt by Lovern Kindzierski (published in Tales#4)
 Slippery Slope by Scott Lobdell (published in Tales#15)
 Thank the Maker by Ryder Windham (published in Tales#6)
 Hunger Pains by Jim Campbell (published in Tales#20)
 Tales from Mos Eisley by Bruce Jones
 Shadow Stalker by Ryder Windham
 Shadows of the Empire by John Wagner
 Battle of the Bounty Hunters pop-up comic by Ryder Windham
 Scoundrel's Wages by Mark Schultz (published in The Bounty Hunters)
 Star Wars Adventures: Luke Skywalker and the Treasure of the Dragonsnakes by Tom Taylor
 Star Wars Adventures: The Will of Darth Vader by Tom Taylor

Return of the Jedi
4 ABY
 Mara Jade: By the Emperor's Hand by Timothy Zahn and Michael A. Stackpole
 The Jabba Tape by John Wagner
 Sand Blasted by Killian Pluckett (published in Tales #4)
 A Day in the Life by Brett Matthews (published in Tales #12)
 Free Memory by Brett Matthews (published in Tales #10)
 Lucky by Rob Williams (published in Tales #23)
 Do or Do Not by Jay Laird (published in Tales #15)
 X-Wing: Rogue Leader by Haden Blackman
 Classic Star Wars: A Long Time Ago... Volume 6: Wookiee World (collects Marvel's Star Wars #82–95)
 Classic Star Wars: The Vandelhelm Mission by Archie Goodwin and Al Williamson (reprints Marvel's Star Wars #98)
 Classic Star Wars: A Long Time Ago... Volume 7: Far, Far Away (collects Marvel's Star Wars #96–107)
 X-wing Rogue Squadron #1–2 by Michael A. Stackpole (Special Wizard Magazine comic) (after the Emperor's death)

New Galactic Republic Era (5–25 ABY)

5 ABY
 Mara Jade: A Night on the Town by Timothy Zahn (published in Tales#1)
 Marooned by Lucas Marangon (published in Tales#22)
 Three Against the Galaxy by Rich Hedden (published in Tales#3)
 Boba Fett: Agent of Doom by John Ostrander
 X-wing Rogue Squadron Special (Kellogg's Apple Jacks Promotion) by Ryder Windham (also published in the Battleground Tatooine TPB)
 The Rebel Opposition by Michael A. Stackpole (X-wing Rogue Squadron #1–4)
 The Phantom Affair by Michael A. Stackpole (X-wing Rogue Squadron #5–8)
 Battleground: Tatooine by Michael A. Stackpole (X-wing Rogue Squadron #9–12)
 The Warrior Princess by Michael A. Stackpole (X-wing Rogue Squadron #13–16)
 Requiem for a Rogue by Michael A. Stackpole (X-wing Rogue Squadron #17–20)
 In the Empire's Service by Michael A. Stackpole (X-wing Rogue Squadron #21–24)
 Shadows of the Empire: Evolution by Steve Perry
 The Making of Baron Fel by Michael A. Stackpole (X-wing Rogue Squadron #25)
 Family Ties by Michael A. Stackpole (X-wing Rogue Squadron #26–27)
 Masquerade by Michael A. Stackpole (X-wing Rogue Squadron #28–31)
 Mandatory Retirement by Michael A. Stackpole (X-wing Rogue Squadron #32–35)
 Phantom Menaces by Joe Casey (published in Tales#17)

6 ABY
 Collapsing New Empires by Jim Pascoe (published in Tales#19)
 Dark Forces: Rebel Agent by William C. Dietz
 Dark Forces: Jedi Knight by William C. Dietz
 Boba Fett: Twin Engines of Destruction by Andy Mangels (published in The Bounty Hunters)

7 ABY
 Problem Solvers by Chris Eliopoulos (published in Tales#20)

8 ABY
 Lando's Commandos: On Eagle's Wings by Carlos Meglia (published in Tales#5)

9 ABY
 The Thrawn Trilogy
 Heir to the Empire by Timothy Zahn and Mike Baron
 Dark Force Rising by Timothy Zahn and Mike Baron
 The Last Command by Timothy Zahn and Mike Baron

10 ABY
 Dark Empire I by Tom Veitch
 Dark Empire II by Tom Veitch

11 ABY
 Boba Fett: Death, Lies, & Treachery by John Wagner
 Empire's End by Tom Veitch
 Crimson Empire by Mike Richardson and Randy Stradley
 Kenix Kil by Randy Stradley (published in The Bounty Hunters)
 Crimson Empire II: Council of Blood by Mike Richardson and Randy Stradley
 Hard Currency by Randy Stradley (published in Dark Horse Extra #21–24)
 The Other by Jason Hall (published in Tales#16)
 Tall Tales by Scott Allie (published in Tales#11)

13 ABY
 The Third Time Pays for All by Randy Stradley (published in Dark Horse Presents #1)
 Crimson Empire III: Empire Lost by Mike Richardson and Randy Stradley
 Jedi Academy: Leviathan by Kevin J. Anderson

15 ABY
 The Secret Tales of Luke's Hand by Henry Gilroy (published in Tales#8)

19 ABY
 Apocalypse Endor by Christian Read (published in Tales#14)

20 ABY
 Union by Michael A. Stackpole

The New Jedi Order Era (25–37 ABY)

25 ABY
 Chewbacca by Darko Macan
 Refugees by Tom Taylor (Invasion #0 & 1–5)
 Rescues by Tom Taylor (Invasion #6–11)
 Revelations by Tom Taylor (Invasion #12–16)
 Revenants by Haden Blackman (published in Tales#18)

28 ABY
 Equals and Opposites by Nathan P. Butler (published in Tales#21)

Legacy Era (40 ABY onwards)

40 ABY
 The Lost Lightsaber by Andrew Robinson & Jim Royal (published in Tales#19)

130 ABY
 Star Wars Legacy: Broken by John Ostrander (Legacy #1–3, 5–7)
 Star Wars Legacy: Noob by John Ostrander (Legacy #4)
 Star Wars Legacy: Allies by John Ostrander (Legacy #8)
 Star Wars Legacy: Trust Issues by John Ostrander (Legacy #9–10)
 Star Wars Legacy: The Ghosts of Ossus by John Ostrander (Legacy #11–12)
 Star Wars Legacy: Ready To Die by John Ostrander (Legacy #13)
 Star Wars Legacy: Claws of the Dragon by John Ostrander (Legacy #14–19)
 Star Wars Legacy: Indomitable by John Ostrander (Legacy #20–21)
 Star Wars Legacy: The Wrath of the Dragon by John Ostrander (Legacy #22)
 Star Wars Legacy: Loyalties by John Ostrander (Legacy #23–24)
 Star Wars Legacy: The Hidden Temple by John Ostrander (Legacy #25–26)
 Star Wars Legacy: Into the Core by John Ostrander (Legacy #27)
 Star Wars Legacy: Vector by John Ostrander (Legacy #28–31)
 Star Wars Legacy: Fight Another Day by John Ostrander (Legacy #32–33)
 Star Wars Legacy: Storms by John Ostrander (Legacy #34–35)
 Star Wars Legacy: Renegade by John Ostrander (Legacy #36)
 Star Wars Legacy: Tatooine by John Ostrander (Legacy #37–40)
 Star Wars Legacy: Rogue's End by John Ostrander (Legacy #41)
 Star Wars Legacy: Divided Loyalties by John Ostrander (Legacy #42)
 Star Wars Legacy: Monster by John Ostrander (Legacy #43–46)
 Star Wars Legacy: The Fate of Dac by John Ostrander (Legacy #47)
 Star Wars Legacy: Extremes by John Ostrander (Legacy #48–50)

138 ABY
 Star Wars Legacy: War by John Ostrander (#1–6)
 Star Wars Legacy: Prisoner of the Floating World by Corinna Bechko and Gabriel Hardman (#1–5)
 Star Wars Legacy: Outcasts of the Broken Ring by Corinna Bechko and Gabriel Hardman (#6–10)
 Star Wars Legacy: Wanted, Ania Solo (#11–15)
 Star Wars Legacy: Empire Of One (#16–18, 0½)

Long after Yavin
 Storyteller by Jason Hall (published in Tales#19)

Infinities Era (not within timeline)

 Infinities
 A New Hope #1–4
 The Empire Strikes Back #1–4
 Return of the Jedi #1–4
 N-canon Star Wars Tales stories
 Skippy the Jedi Droid by Peter David (published in Tales #1)
 Stop that Jawa! by Dave Cooper (published in Tales #2)
 A Death Star is Born by Kevin Rubio (published in Tales #4)
 Spare Parts by Mark Evanier (published in Tales #4)
 What They Called Me by Craig Thompson (published in Tales #5)
 Hoth by Tony Millionaire (published in Tales #5)
 A Hot Time in the Cold Town Tonite by Ian Edginton (published in Tales #6)
 Junkheap Hero by Mark Evanierspli (published in Tales #6)
 Jedi Chef by Randy Stradley (published in Tales #7)
 Force Fiction by Kevin Rubio (published in Tales #7)
 Captain Threepio by Ryan Kinnaird (published in Tales #8)
 The One that Got Away by Andi Watson (published in Tales #8)
 Resurrection by Ron Marz (published in Tales #9)
 Lil' Maul in: Hate Leads to Lollipops by Dave McCaig (published in  Tales #9)
 The Rebel Four by Jay Stephens (published in Tales #9)
 Skreej by Mike Kennedy (published in Tales #10)
 A Wookiee Scorned by Jason Hall (published in Tales #10)
 Prey by Kia Asamiya (published in Tales #11)
 The Revenge of Tag and Bink by Kevin Rubio (published in Tales #12)
 The Emperor's Court by Jason Hall (published in Tales #14)
 Smuggler's Blues by Matthew and Shawn Fillbach (published in Tales #14)
 The Sandstorm by Jason Hall (published in Tales #15)
 Best Birthday Ever by Tod Parkhill (published in Tales #16)
 The Long, Bad Day by Mike Denning (published in Tales #16)
 Kessel Run by Gilbert Austin (published in Tales #16)
 Lunch Break by Jonathan Adams (published in Tales #16)
 The Rebel Club by Scott Kurtz (published in Tales #19)
 Into the Great Unknown by Haden Blackman (published in Tales #19; crossover with Indiana Jones)
 Who's Your Daddy by Jason (published in Tales #20)
 Fred Jawa by Jason (published in Tales #20)
 Failing Up with Jar Jar Binks by Peter Bagge (published in Tales #20)
 Melvin Fett by James Kochalka (published in Tales #20)
 Fett Club by Kevin Rubio (published in Tales #24)
 Tag and Bink: Revenge of the Clone Menace by Kevin Rubio
 Tag and Bink Are Dead #1–2 by Kevin Rubio
 The Return of Tag and Bink: Special Edition by Kevin Rubio
 Sergio Stomps Star Wars by Sergio Aragones
 Star Wars: Visionaries
 The Star Wars #1–4 and posthumous #0 (adapted from George Lucas's 1974 screenplay The Star Wars: Rough Draft).

Writers
This is a list of Star Wars comic book writers.  It covers those who have written for series, one-shots, film adaptations, and comics from Star Wars Tales.

 Jonathan Adams
 Paul Alden
 Peter Alilunas
 Scott Allie
 Phil Amara
 Kevin J. Anderson
 Thomas Andrews
 Kia Asamiya
 Brian Augustyn
 Chris Avellone
 Peter Bagge
 Jeremy Barlow
 Mike Baron
 Jim Beard
 Scott Beatty
 Haden Blackman
 Nathan P. Butler
 Joe Casey
 C.B. Cebulski
 Paul Chadwick
 Chris Claremont
 Dave Cooper
 Brian Daley
 Peter David
 Mike Denning
 William C. Dietz
 Andy Diggle
 Chuck Dixon
 Jan Duursema
 Ian Edginton
 Chris Eliopoulos
 Garth Ennis
 Paul Ens
 Mark Evanierspli
 Tom Fassbender
 Matthew Fillbach
 Shawn Fillbach
 Alan Dean Foster
 Alexander Freed
 Milton Freewater Jr.
 Warren J. Fu
 Adam Gallardo
 Rick Geary
 Henry Gilroy
 Archie Goodwin
 Jason Hall
 Rich Handley
 Bob Harris
 Mick Harrison
 Welles Hartley
 Rich Hedden
 Gilbert Hernandez
 Pablo Hidalgo
 Shin-ichi Hiromoto
 Tony Isabella
 Matt Jacobs
 Bruce Jones
 Ryan Kaufman
 Mike Kennedy
 Ryan Kinnaird
 Sean Konot
 Jim Krueger
 Toshiki Kudo
 Scott Kurtz
 Jay Laird
 Justin Lambros
 Miles Lane
 Paul Lee
 Sang Jun Lee
 Ken Lizzi
 Darko Macan
 David Manak
 Andy Mangels
 Russ Manning
 Lucas Marangon
 Ron Marz
 Brett Matthews
 Aaron McBride
 Shane McCarthy
 Carlos Meglia
 Steven Melching
 John Jackson Miller
 Pat Mills
 Alan Moore
 Steve Moore
 Scott Morse
 Dean Motter
 Tim Mucci
 Michael Murnane
 Fabian Nicieza
 Steve Niles
 Phill Norwood
 John Ostrander
 Steve Parkhouse
 Jim Pascoe
 Steve Perry
 Doug Petrie
 Killian Pluckett
 Christian Read
 Mike Richardson
 Andrew Robinson
 Jim Royal
 Kevin Rubio
 Stan Sakai
 Mark Schultz
 Louise Simonson
 Beau Smith
 Michael A. Stackpole
 Jay Stephens
 Randy Stradley
 Jan Strnad
 Tom Taylor
 Darek Thompson
 Dan Thorsland
 Erik Tiemens
 Timothy Truman
 Tom Veitch
 John Wagner
 Chris Warner
 Nathan Walker
 Andi Watson
 Rob Williams
 Ryder Windham
 Judd Winick
 Jim Woodring
 Timothy Zahn

Star Wars manga

All are Legends adaptations of the films or Canon adaptations of canonical TV shows/novels.

Film
Produced before Disney, and as a result they take place in the Legends continuity.

 Episode I: The Phantom Menace (manga) by Kia Asamiya
 Episode IV: A New Hope (manga) by Hisao Tamaki
 Episode V: The Empire Strikes Back (manga) by Toshiki Kudo
 Episode VI: Return of the Jedi (manga) by Shin-ichi Hiromoto

Star Wars: Story Before the Force Awakens (2015)
The comic series listed here is licensed by Disney but was not released by Marvel or Disney-Lucasfilm Press. Its canonical status is disputed due to some minor changes made to the story due to cultural interpretation but all are film adaptations.

Star Wars: Story Before the Force Awakens is a webcomic adaptation of the original trilogy by Korean artist and writer Hong Jac-ga. The strips were translated to English and have been made available worldwide on the platform Webtoon.  The Story Before the Force Awakens spans the "Rise of the Empire Era" and the "Rebellion Era". The English translations have since been removed and there is no information if they will ever be re-released.

 An Old Friend (Issue #1) (12 BBY–6 BBY)
 Meeting the Droids (Issue #2) (6 BBY–0 BBY)
 Beginning of an Adventure (Issue #3) (0 BBY)
 Only Hope (Issue #4) (0 BBY)
 Escape (Issue #5) (0 BBY)
 Death Star (Issue #6) (0 BBY)
 Rescue (Issue #7) (0 BBY)
 Darth Vader (Issue #8) (0 BBY)
 Vanishing into the Force (Issue #9) (0 BBY)
 The Little Spark (Issue #10) (0 BBY)
 X-Wing (Issue #11) (0 BBY)
 One Shot (Issue #12) (0 BBY)
 Awakening of the Force (Issue #13) (0 BBY)
 Miracle of Yavin (Issue #14) (0 BBY)
 Suffering (Issue #15) (3 ABY)
 Strike (Issue #16) (3 ABY)
 Retreat (Issue #17) (3 ABY)
 Dagobah (Issue #18) (3 ABY)
 Master Yoda (Issue #19) (3 ABY)
 Training (Issue #20) (3 ABY)
 Dark Side of Force (Issue #21) (3 ABY)
 Calling (Issue #22) (3 ABY)
 Trap (Issue #23) (3 ABY)
 Unprepared Duel (Issue #24) (3 ABY)
 The Cruel Truth (Issue #25) (3 ABY)
 Choice (Issue #26) (3 ABY)
 Determination (Issue #27) (3 ABY)
 Jabba's Palace (Issue #28) (4 ABY)
 Pit of Carkoon (Issue #29) (4 ABY)
 Lightsaber (Issue #30) (4 ABY)
 Rescue (Issue #31) (4 ABY)
 Secret of Birth (Issue #32) (4 ABY)
 Forest Moon (Issue #33) (4 ABY)
 Protectors of the Forest (Issue #34) (4 ABY)
 Surrender (Issue #35) (4 ABY)
 The Emperor (Issue #36) (4 ABY)
 Rage (Issue #37) (4 ABY)
 Light vs. Dark (Issue #38) (4 ABY)
 Epiphany (Issue #39) (4 ABY)
 The End (Issue #40) (4 ABY)

Television
The comic series listed here is licensed by Disney but was not released by Marvel or Disney-Lucasfilm Press. Its canonical status is disputed due to some minor changes made to the story due to cultural interpretation but adapts a canonical TV show.

Star Wars Rebels webcomic
Star Wars Rebels is an ongoing webcomic by Japanese artist Akira Aoki. It adapts the first season of the TV show Star Wars Rebels, consists of 28 chapters, and despite being made for a Japanese audience, it was partially translated into English in November 2020.

Novel

The comics listed here are licensed by Disney but were not released by Marvel or Disney-Lucasfilm Press. Their canonical status is disputed due to some minor changes made to the story due to cultural interpretation, but all adapt canonical novels.

Star Wars: Lost Stars (2017)
Star Wars: Lost Stars is a webcomic adaptation of the Claudia Gray novel of the same name by Japanese artist and writer Komiyama Yuusaku. The strips debuted May 4, 2017, on the Japanese version of WEBTOON. The first trade paperback was released in December 2017, with an English translation released in May 2018. The events of Lost Stars span the Rise of the Empire Era, the Rebellion Era, and the New Republic Era, from approximately 11 years before Episode IV: A New Hope to 1 year after Episode VI: Return of the Jedi.
Volume 1 (December 2017)
Prologue #1 (May 2017)
Prologue #2 (May 2017)
Issue #1 (June 2017)
Artwork #1 (June 2017)
Issue #2 (July 2017)
Issue #3 (July 2017)
Issue #4 (August 2017)
Issue #5 (August 2017)
Issue #6 (September 2017)
Issue #7 (September 2017)
Issue #8 (October 2017)
Issue #9 (October 2017)
Issue #10 (November 2017)
Issue #11 (November 2017)
Volume 2 (April 2019)
Issue #12 (December 2017)
Artwork #2 (December 2017)
Issue #13 (January 2018)
Issue #14 (January 2018)
Issue #15 (February 2018)
Issue #16 (February 2018)
Issue #17 (March 2018)
Issue #18 (March 2018)
Issue #19 (April 2018)
Issue #20 (May 2018)
Issue #21 (May 2018)
Issue #22 (June 2018)
Issue #23 (July 2018)
Volume 3 (April 2020)
Issue #24 (July 2018)
Issue #25 (August 2018)
Issue #26 (September 2018)
Issue #27 (September 2018)
Issue #28 (October 2018)
Issue #29 (November 2018)
Issue #30 (November 2018)
Issue #31 (December 2018)
Issue #32 (December 2018)
Issue #33 (January 2019)
Issue #34 (February 2019)
Issue #35 (March 2019)
Issue #36 (March 2019)
Uncollected
Bonus (April 2019)

Leia Organa: Ordeal of the Princess (2018)
Leia Organa: Ordeal of the Princess is a webcomic adaptation of the Claudia Gray novel of the same name by Japanese artist Haruichi. The strips began releasing in May 2019 on WEBTOON, however, the manga was put on hold after the 11th issue because the artist had some health issues. The manga takes place approximately three years before Episode IV: A New Hope.

Star Wars: Lords of the Sith and Star Wars: Heir to the Jedi (2018)
Star Wars: Lords of the Sith and Star Wars: Heir to the Jedi were planned Japanese manga adaptations of the novels by the same names. These manga were eventually canceled, and replaced with a Star Wars Rebels webcomic. An excerpt from the Lords of the Sith manga was included in the English paperback of the Rebels webcomic.

The Legends of Luke Skywalker-The Manga (2020)
The Legends of Luke Skywalker-The Manga is a manga adaptation of the novel The Legends of Luke Skywalker by Ken Liu. The manga is split up into four parts: "The Starship Graveyard", "I, Droid", "The Tale of Lugubrious Mote", and "Big Inside", all of which are drawn by different artists.

Star Wars: Guardians of the Whills: The Manga (2021)
Guardians of the Whills: The Manga is an upcoming manga adaptation of the novel Guardians of the Whills by Greg Rucka. It will be written by Jon Tsuei and published by Viz Media.

Original manga stories
The comic listed here will be licensed by Disney, but will not be released by Marvel or Disney-Lucasfilm Press. As it will not be an adaptation, it can be assumed that it will be Canon.

Star Wars: The High Republic: The Edge of Balance (2021)
The High Republic: The Edge of Balance is an upcoming original manga in the High Republic multimedia project. It will be written by Shima Shinya and Justina Ireland, and it will be published by Viz Media.

See also
List of Star Wars books

References
Footnotes

Citations

External links
 Dark Horse, publisher of most Star Wars Comics: timeline
 List of Star Wars comic books on Wookieepedia
 The Star Wars Extended Universe Timeline

 
Comics
Star Wars
Star Wars comics

es:Star Wars (historieta)
fr:Star Wars (bande dessinée)
hu:Star Wars képregények listája